David Braz de Oliveira Filho (born 21 May 1987), known as David Braz, is a Brazilian footballer who plays for Fluminense as a central defender.

Club career

Palmeiras
Born in Guarulhos, São Paulo, Braz graduated with Palmeiras' youth setup. He made his professional debut on 10 February 2007, coming on as a substitute for Dininho in a 1–1 home draw against Bragantino for the Campeonato Paulista championship.

Braz appeared more regularly in the Campeonato Brasileiro Série A, after the arrival of new manager Vanderlei Luxemburgo. However, after struggling with injuries, he lost his starting spot.

Panathinaikos
On 19 January 2009 Braz signed a four-and-a-half year deal with Greek giants Panathinaikos in a free transfer, after alleging irregularities with his contract. He made his debut for the side on 15 March, replacing fellow countryman Marcelo Mattos in a 1–0 away defeat of Thrasyvoulos.

Flamengo
On 21 July 2009, after appearing rarely, Braz signed a one-year loan deal with Flamengo. He made his debut on 9 August, starting in a 1–0 home win over Corinthians.

A backup to Álvaro and Ronaldo Angelim, Braz contributed with one goal in ten appearances as his side lifted the league trophy in the last round. On 12 August 2010, Flamengo acquired 60% of his rights, with the player signing a new four-year deal.

Santos

On 18 May 2012 Braz moved to Santos, along with Flamengo teammate Rafael Galhardo, in an exchange for Ibson. He acted mainly as a backup to Edu Dracena and Durval during his first year, appearing in only seven matches.

Loan to Vitória
In January 2013, after being deemed surplus to requirements by manager Muricy Ramalho, Braz was loaned to Vitória. However, in August he was left out of the first-team squad, later accusing the club of not paying his wages. He eventually returned to Santos in December.

Return to Santos
Shortly after his return to Peixe, new manager Oswaldo de Oliveira granted his place in the first-team. Profiting from Dracena and Gustavo Henrique's injuries, he was later first-choice in the end of the 2014 Campeonato Paulista, and remained a starter in Série A.

On 6 September 2014 Braz scored his first goals for Santos, netting a brace in a 3–1 home win against his former side Vitória. He played his 100th game for the club on 4 October of the following year, starting in a 3–1 home win against Fluminense.

A regular starter, Braz played his 200th match for the club on 5 April 2018, in a 1–0 away win against Estudiantes de La Plata.

Loan to Sivasspor
On 8 August 2018, Braz was loaned to Süper Lig side Sivasspor for one year, with an option to buy for a fee of € 2 million.

Grêmio
On 25 May 2019, Santos announced the signing of Marinho, while Braz moved to Grêmio as a part of the deal. Initially a starter, he subsequently fell down the pecking order and rescinded his contract on 16 April 2021.

Fluminense
On 16 April 2021, Braz signed a deal with Fluminense until April 2023.

International career
Braz was capped at under-18 and under-20 levels for Brazil.

Career statistics

Honours

Club
Palmeiras
Campeonato Paulista: 2008

Flamengo
Campeonato Brasileiro Série A: 2009
Campeonato Carioca: 2011
Taça Guanabara: 2011
Taça Rio: 2011

Santos
Recopa Sudamericana: 2012
Campeonato Paulista: 2015, 2016

Fluminense
Taça Guanabara: 2022
Campeonato Carioca: 2022

International
Brazil U20
South American Youth Championship: 2007

Individual
Campeonato Paulista Team of the year: 2015

References

External links
Santos official profile 

1987 births
Living people
People from Guarulhos
Brazilian footballers
Association football defenders
Campeonato Brasileiro Série A players
Sociedade Esportiva Palmeiras players
CR Flamengo footballers
Santos FC players
Esporte Clube Vitória players
Grêmio Foot-Ball Porto Alegrense players
Fluminense FC players
Panathinaikos F.C. players
Sivasspor footballers
Brazil youth international footballers
Brazil under-20 international footballers
Brazilian expatriate footballers
Brazilian expatriate sportspeople in Greece
Brazilian expatriate sportspeople in Turkey
Expatriate footballers in Greece
Expatriate footballers in Turkey
Footballers from São Paulo (state)